Goondi is a locality in the Cassowary Coast Region, Queensland, Australia.

Geography 
Goondi is riverside land wrapped around the southern side of an elbow-shaped bend in the Johnstone River. It is very flat land, being 0 to 10 metres above sea level, and is predominantly used for growing sugar cane and bananas. Reid Creek flows from the north-east of the locality from neighbouring Sundown though to the Johnstone River in the north of the locality. There is very little residential development in Goondi.

The Bruce Highway passes from south to north through the south-western edge of Goondi crossing the Johnstone River at the Sir Joseph McAvoy Bridge, while the North Coast railway line travels from south to north along Goondi's north-eastern border and crosses the Johnstone River. There is a private cane train tramway in the west of the locality, used to transport harvested sugar cane to the local sugar mill.

History 

The name "Goondi' is believed to be an Aboriginal word meaning "elbow", referring to the bend in the river.

The Goondi Sugar Mill opened in 1883, between the end of Goondi Mill Road and Knox Avenue near the Johnstone River. It closed in 1987 after being taken over by Bundaberg Sugar.

Goondi Provisional School opened on 17 February 1898. On 1 January 1909, it became Goondi State School. It was originally located on the south side of Goondi Mill Road (approx ), but, by 1974, had relocated to the school's present location in Goondi Bend.

Education 
There are no schools in Goondi. The nearest government primary school is Goondi State School in neighbouring Goondi Bend to the south-east. The nearest government secondary school is Innisfail State College in Innisfail Estate to the east.

See also
 List of tramways in Queensland

References

Further reading

External links 

 

Cassowary Coast Region
Localities in Queensland